Mikhail Ilyich Borodulin (8 July 1967 — 22 December 2003) was a Kazakhstani professional ice hockey player. He played for Metallurg Magnitogorsk and Torpedo Ust-Kamenogorsk during his playing career. Borodulin also played for the Kazakhstan national team at the 1998 Winter Olympics and the 1998 World Championship. He died of cancer in 2003.

Career statistics

Regular season and playoffs

International

References

External links

1967 births
2003 deaths
Deaths from cancer in Russia
Ice hockey players at the 1998 Winter Olympics
Soviet ice hockey right wingers
Kazakhstani ice hockey right wingers
Kazzinc-Torpedo players
Metallurg Magnitogorsk players
Olympic ice hockey players of Kazakhstan
Sportspeople from Oskemen